Paul Wessenger (born December 25, 1937) is a former Canadian politician in Ontario. He was a New Democratic Party member of the Legislative Assembly of Ontario from 1990 to 1995 who represented the central Ontario riding of Simcoe Centre.

Background
Wessenger attended the University of Toronto, receiving a law degree. He worked as a lawyer in Toronto for four and a half years, and then practiced in Barrie, Ontario for a further twenty-one years.  From 1973 to 1976 he served as an alderman within Barrie. There is a street in Barrie named after him.

Politics
He ran for the Ontario legislature in the 1975 provincial election, coming a close second to Progressive Conservative incumbent Art Evans in the riding of Simcoe Centre. He ran again in the 1977 provincial election, losing to the PC candidate George William Taylor by a greater margin.

Wessenger ran for the House of Commons of Canada as a candidate for the federal New Democratic Party in the 1980 federal election, but finished third in the riding of Simcoe South.  He ran a third provincial campaign in the 1985 provincial election, but again lost to PC candidate Earl Rowe.

The NDP won a majority government in the 1990 provincial election, and Wessenger, running for a fourth time in Simcoe Centre, defeated incumbent Liberal Bruce Owen by almost 3,000 votes.  He served as parliamentary assistant to the Attorney General from 1991 to 1995 and to the Minister of Health for the remainder of his time in office.

In 1992, Wessenger and Jack Layton travelled the province to seek public consultation on changes to Ontario's Public Hospitals Act.

The NDP were defeated in the 1995 provincial election, and Wessenger finished third against PC candidate Joe Tascona.

Electoral record

References

External links
 

1937 births
Living people
Ontario New Democratic Party MPPs
People from Brockville
University of Toronto alumni